Paul Bernard may refer to:
Paul Bernard (composer) (1827–1879), French composer
Paul Bernard (actor) (1898–1958), French actor
Paul Bernard (director) (1929–1997), English TV director
 Paul Bernard (archaeologist) (1929–2015), French archaeologist
Paul Bernard (footballer) (born 1972), Scottish footballer
Paul Bernard, Psychiatrist, a 1971-72 Canadian television series